Captain Robert Robinson (1685? – May 7, 1762) was born in Miller Place, New York. A Queen Anne's War veteran, he is considered to be one of the founders of the hamlet of Yaphank, Suffolk County, New York in 1726.  He married Mary Davis in 1703. Captain Robinson died May 7, 1762 in Pipestove Hollow, Mount Sinai, New York. His father was John Robinson (1654–1734), a member of the General Assembly of 1691 from Queens County.

References

1680s births
1762 deaths
People from Miller Place, New York
Queen Anne's War
People from Yaphank, New York
People from Mount Sinai, New York